A fullback (FB) is a position in the offensive backfield in gridiron football, and is one of the two running back positions along with the halfback. Fullbacks are typically larger than halfbacks and in most offensive schemes the fullback's duties are split among power running, pass catching, and blocking for both the quarterback and the other running back.

Many great runners in the history of American football have been fullbacks, including Jim Brown, Marion Motley, Bronko Nagurski, Jim Taylor, Franco Harris, Larry Csonka, John Riggins, Christian Okoye, and Levi Jackson. However, many of these runners would retroactively be labeled as halfbacks, due to their position as the primary ball carrier; they were primarily listed as fullbacks due to their size and did not often perform the run-blocking duties expected of modern fullbacks. Examples of players who have excelled at the hybrid running–blocking–pass-catching role include Vonta Leach, Mike Alstott, William Henderson, Daryl Johnston, Kyle Juszczyk, John Kuhn, Le'Ron McClain, Lorenzo Neal, Marcel Reece, and Tom Rathman.

History
In the days before two platoons, the fullback was usually the team's punter and drop kicker. When, at the beginning of the 20th century, a penalty was introduced for hitting the opposing kicker after a kick, the foul was at first called "running into the fullback", inasmuch as the deepest back usually did the kicking.

Before the emergence of the T-formation in the 1940s, most teams used four offensive backs, lined up behind the offensive line, on every play: a quarterback, two halfbacks, and a fullback. The quarterback began each play a quarter of the way "back" behind the offensive line, the halfbacks began each play side by side and halfway "back" behind the offensive line, and the fullback began each play the farthest "back" behind the offensive line.  

As the game evolved and alternate formations came in and went out of fashion, halfbacks (reduced to typically just one rather than two) emerged as the offensive backs most likely to run the ball. "Halfback" came to be synonymous with "running back". Formations began to favor placing the fullback—the back most entrusted with blocking for the running back—closer to the line of scrimmage than the running back. These blocking backs retained the name "fullback" even though they were closer to the offensive line than the halfback. The term "halfback" declined in usage, replaced variously with the more descriptive term "tailback" or the generic term "running back".

In the modern game, when the quarterback is under center, the fullback most often lines up directly behind the quarterback and in front of the halfback or tailback. The fullback position has seen a decline in recent time,  with only 17 full-time fullbacks playing in 2016. The trend can be traced back to teams choosing to pass more, the use of "11 personnel" (one running back and one tight end), and the use of hybrid "H-backs".

Characteristics

Fullbacks are typically known less for speed and agility and more for muscularity and the ability to shed tackles. In 2010s NFL, fullbacks, while occasionally deployed as ball carriers, are often primarily a lead blocker to allow running backs to get to the secondary of the opposing team's defense. In the early 2000s, many NFL teams used blocking fullbacks, such as Tony Richardson, Vonta Leach, and Lorenzo Neal, with great success. These backs cleared the way for some of the decade's great running backs. Later on, some teams have phased the fullback position out of their offense altogether, with those teams either all but eschewing the I-formation, or instead utilizing either a tight end, h-back, or backup running-back in the role. 

Prominent fullbacks in the NFL as of 2022 include C. J. Ham, Andy Janovich, Jamize Olawale, Reggie Gilliam, Patrick Ricard, Alec Ingold, Bruce Miller, Cullen Gillaspia, Anthony Sherman, Kyle Juszczyk, and Keith Smith. In spite of their usually infrequent carries, some fullbacks have led their teams in rushing – among the most notable ones were Le'Ron McClain who was the rushing leader for the Baltimore Ravens in 2008 and Tony Richardson who led the Kansas City Chiefs in rushing in 2000. In 2010, Peyton Hillis led the Cleveland Browns in rushing yards with 1,177 yards as a fullback before being converted into a halfback.

Blocking

Although technically running backs, typically fullbacks are primarily valued for their blocking in most 21st century offenses. The most common and simple runs—the dive and the blast—both employ the fullback as the primary blocker for the halfback. In the flexbone formation, however, the fullback (sometimes referred to as the B-back) can often be used as the primary rushing threat. 

In many other offensive schemes, the fullback is used as a receiver, especially when the defense blitzes.  In selected plays, some teams will have a lineman report as an eligible receiver to line up as a fullback ("Jumbo" or "Heavy Jumbo") or as a tight end in a "Miami" package in goal-line formations.  Players who have been frequently used as situational fullbacks include Haloti Ngata, Dontari Poe, Jared Allen while with the Kansas City Chiefs, Richard Seymour while with the New England Patriots, and Isaac Sopoaga while with the San Francisco 49ers, while Dan Klecko and Nikita Whitlock have played both as a defensive tackle and fullback. Defensive Tackle William "The Refrigerator" Perry scored a touchdown in Super Bowl XX from the fullback position.

Substitutes 
Most teams in the NFL do not have a substitute fullback, though there are exceptions.  The role can be filled by backup or number three or four tight ends or bigger and less-frequently-used running backs. Occasionally, defensive tackles have been used in the fullback position (famous examples include William "The Refrigerator" Perry and Kyle Williams); this is most commonly used in goal-line situations, where the defensive tackle's size and ability to penetrate a wall of players becomes an advantage.  In modern offenses, fullbacks in an I-formation can be motioned into a 2-TE formation or H-back formation, making a running back or tight end fairly well suited to the role.

Canadian football
The fullback position is less frequently used in Canadian football, which focuses more on passing than running the ball.

References

American football positions